The Middle Border Conference, or MBC, is a high school athletic conference in Western Wisconsin.  It participates in the WIAA. The conference headquarters are located in New Richmond, Wisconsin. The Middle Border Conference began in 1931–32 with the charter schools of Ellsworth, River Falls, New Richmond, Spring Valley, Menomonie, Colfax and Hudson. The MBC has 16 total sports for male and female athletes to participate in.

Current schools
Current schools in the Middle Border Conference are:
Amery High School
Baldwin-Woodville Area School District
Ellsworth Community School
New Richmond High School
Osceola High School
Prescott High School
Somerset High School
St. Croix Central High School

Former schools
Former schools of the Middle Border Conference:
Durand High School
Glenwood City High School
Menomonie High School
Colfax High School
Bloomer High School
River Falls High School
Hudson High School
St. Croix Falls High School
Unity School District
  Spring Valley high school

See also
List of high school athletic conferences in Wisconsin

References

External links
Middle Border Conference Website

Wisconsin high school sports conferences
Supraorganizations
High school sports conferences and leagues in the United States